Eustrophopsis brunneimarginatus is a species of polypore fungus beetle in the family Tetratomidae which is found within North America 

This species' pronotum and elytra appear uniform in color with a piceous to black appearance with characteristic, contrasting rufous lateral margins. Individuals of this species may be distinguished from the subfamily Eustrophinae with the presence of lighter color marginal bands along the, contrasting, darker pronotum and elytra.

References 

Tenebrionoidea
Spiders described in 1906
Spiders of North America